Hoya benstoneana is an endemic species of porcelainflower or wax plant found in the Philippines is an Asclepiad species of flowering plant in the dogbane family Apocynaceae described in 2012 by Kloppenburg, Siar, Guevarra & Carandang. Hoya benstoneana belongs to the genus Hoya.

Etymology
The specific epithet, benstoneana named in honor of Dr. Benjamin C. Stone, who worked as a Principal investigator of the Flora of the Philippines Project.

References

benstoneana
Endemic flora of the Philippines
benstoneana